Upper Perkiomen School District is located in the northern corner of Montgomery County and the eastern corner of Berks County in Pennsylvania.  

The district comprises the townships of Upper Hanover and Marlborough and the boroughs of East Greenville, Green Lane, Pennsburg, and Red Hill in Montgomery County and Hereford Township in Berks County.

The district's high school for grades nine through 12 is Upper Perkiomen High School, sometimes called "Upper Perk High School". Its middle school is Upper Perkiomen Middle School. It maintains a 4th and 5th grade center and two elementary schools, Hereford Elementary and Marlborough Elementary, for kindergarten through third grades.

As of the 2021-22 school year, the district had 3,231 students and 210 teachers on an FTE basis for a teacher-student ratio of 15.38, according to the National Center for Education Statistics.

Schools
 Hereford Elementary School (K-3)
 Marlborough Elementary School (K-3)
 Upper Perkiomen 4th and 5th Grade Center (4-5)
 Upper Perkiomen Middle School (6-8)
 Upper Perkiomen High School (9-12)

References

External links 

School districts in Berks County, Pennsylvania
School districts in Montgomery County, Pennsylvania